John Russell Fairchild (born April 28, 1943) is a retired American basketball player.

Born in Encinitas, California, Fairchild played high school basketball at San Dieguito High School (class of 1961) and college basketball at Brigham Young University.  In two years at BYU, he averaged 20.9 points and 12.8 rebounds per game, and was named WAC Player of the Year in his senior season.

Fairchild was drafted by the Los Angeles Lakers with the 8th pick of the 2nd round (16th overall pick) of the 1965 NBA draft.  He played for the Lakers during the 1965–66 NBA season.

Fairchild later played in the American Basketball Association as a 6'8" forward for the Anaheim Amigos (1967–68), averaging 10.9 points per game. Fairchild later played for the Denver Rockets (1968–69 season), Indiana Pacers (1968–69 and 1969–1970 seasons) and Kentucky Colonels (1969–1970 season).  He was a member of the Pacers team that was the ABA runner-up in 1969 and the subsequent team that won the 1970 ABA Championship.

References

External links

1943 births
Living people
All-American college men's basketball players
American men's basketball players
Anaheim Amigos players
Basketball players from California
BYU Cougars men's basketball players
Denver Rockets players
Indiana Pacers players
Junior college men's basketball players in the United States
Kentucky Colonels players
Los Angeles Lakers draft picks
Los Angeles Lakers players
People from Encinitas, California
Small forwards
Sportspeople from San Diego County, California